The 2019–20 Alba Berlin season will be the 28th season in the existence of the club. The club will play in the Basketball Bundesliga (BBL) and EuroLeague. It will be the third season under head coach Aíto García Reneses, who extended his contract on 8 August 2019. Alba returned to the EuroLeague after an absence of 5 years, after finishing second in the 2018–19 BBL season.

Players

Squad information

Depth chart

Transactions

In

|}

Out

|}

References

External links
 Official website

Alba
Alba